Gustaf Einar Du Rietz (1895–1967) was a Swedish lichenologist and ecologist. He was part of a Swedish Australasian Botanical Expedition to New Zealand in 1926 to study lichens in New Zealand along with his wife Greta Sernander-Du Rietz, who was also a lichenologist.  He later became professor of plant ecology at the University of Uppsala in 1934.

References

Swedish lichenologists
1895 births
1967 deaths